Chief Carl Terry Saul (1921–1976) also known as C. Terry Saul and Tabaksi, was a Choctaw Nation/Chickasaw illustrator, painter, muralist, commercial artist, and educator. He was a leader of the Choctaw/Chickasaw tribe. He served as Director of the art program at Bacone College in Muskogee, Oklahoma, from 1970 until 1976.

Biography 
Saul attended Bacone College, where he studied under Acee Blue Eagle, and Woody Crumbo. His classmates at Bacone College included Walter Richard “Dick” West, Sr. and Oscar Howe, all of which started the early process of departing for traditional Native art and painting-styles, and moving towards Surrealism and engaging in modernist aesthetics. 

He served in the United States Army during World War II. After the war, Saul continued his studies at University of Oklahoma, Norman (OU), where he received a BFA degree (1948) and MFA degree (1949); and at the Art Students League of New York, from 1951 to 1952. Saul was the first Native American student to receive a MFA degree from the University of Oklahoma.

In 1960, he lived in Bartlesville, Oklahoma and in addition to painting, Saul worked at the Phillips Petroleum Company. He is known for his watercolor paintings, and casein paintings depicting Plains Tribes heritage and ceremonies. He later returned to teach at Bacone College, where he served as the Director of the art program from 1970 to 1976. One of his students was Joan Brown. 

His artwork is in museum collections, including the Gilcrease Museum, Fred Jones Jr. Museum of Art, and the Philbrook Museum of Art.

Publications

References 

1921 births
1976 deaths
Choctaw people
Chickasaw people
Bacone College alumni
Bacone College faculty
University of Oklahoma alumni
Art Students League of New York alumni
Native American painters
People from Pushmataha County, Oklahoma
People from Bartlesville, Oklahoma
United States Army personnel of World War II